Robert E. Thacker (February 21, 1918 – November 25, 2020) was an American test pilot, aeromodeling enthusiast and designer, one of the few pilots in history to do tours of duty in two different theaters of operation (Europe and the Pacific) in World War II and the holder of a number of aviation records.

Biography

Thacker was born in February 1918. His interest in aviation was sparked in 1926 at age eight when a neighbor purchased an operating model aircraft.  By 1929, Thacker had completed his first model, that of the Spirit of St. Louis, and went on to earn spending money building balsa gliders.  He joined his first aeromodeling club in El Centro, California in 1932.  He would also become the Southern California yo-yo champion that year; his prize was $40.00 in the form of $25, $10 and $5 gold coins.

In wartime, Thacker flew two tours of duty in a B-17 in World War II, a single tour in the Korean War with a B-29 Superfortress and classified high-altitude reconnaissance missions during the Vietnam War. His initiation into World War II came when he was one of the pilots of a flight of 12 B-17s bound for the Philippines via Hawaii; they arrived in Hawaii just before 8:00 am on December 7, 1941, in the midst of the surprise Japanese attack on Pearl Harbor.

His wartime service earned him two Silver Stars, three Distinguished Flying Crosses, ten Air Medals and the French Croix de Guerre with Palm.

A graduate of the Air Force Test Pilot Academy at California's Edwards Air Force Base, Thacker was responsible for testing a wide variety of aircraft between 1939 and 1970, including the first accelerated tests of the P-80 combat-ready jet fighter, assisted by then Captain Chuck Yeager.

His most notable achievement came in 1947 with his test of Betty Jo, a North American F-82 Twin Mustang named after his wife. This was to be the first nonstop test of a fully laden fighter between Honolulu, Hawaii and New York City, New York. Both the aircraft and the flight jacket Thacker wore are on display at the National Museum of the United States Air Force at Wright-Patterson Air Force Base. His co-pilot on the trip was Lieutenant John Ard. The trip remains the longest and fastest ever by a propeller-driven fighter.

Another notable achievement came in 1972 when Bob served as an advisor on a solar-powered aircraft project designed and built by Astro Flight for Lockheed.

On January 9, 2010, Colonel Thacker was inducted into the Academy of Model Aeronautics Hall of Fame for his work in both model and full-scale aviation during day two of the AMA's annual exposition at the Ontario Convention Center, Ontario, California. Among the dignitaries present were then-AMA president Dave Brown and retired space shuttle commander Robert "Hoot" Gibson, himself a strong supporter of the AMA.

Thacker latterly resided in San Clemente, California, where he remained active in the hobby of radio-controlled model aviation as an active AMA member, and frequently participated in meets in and around Southern California with his giant-scale, turbine-powered F-15 Eagle. He turned 100 in February 2018 and died in November 2020 at the age of 102.

References

External links
Biography at Modelaircraft.org
 Col. Robert E. Thacker's A-2 jacket on display in the Korean War Gallery at the National Museum of the U.S. Air Force. (U.S. Air Force photo)
May, 2001 newsletter of Southern California's JMRC Flyers R/C club announcing a visit by Col. Thacker
Article on the record breaking Honolulu-New York flight at Findarticles.com

1918 births
2020 deaths
United States Air Force personnel of the Korean War
United States Air Force personnel of the Vietnam War
American aviation record holders
American aviators
American centenarians
American Korean War bomber pilots
American test pilots
American Vietnam War pilots
Aviation pioneers
Men centenarians
Military personnel from California
Recipients of the Croix de Guerre (France)
Recipients of the Distinguished Flying Cross (United States)
Recipients of the Silver Star
United States Army Air Forces bomber pilots of World War II
U.S. Air Force Test Pilot School alumni